The Faction is a London-based theatre company.
The Faction is beginning to develop a real signature in imaginative, contemporary and visceral versions of the classics. Amid the current debate between the rise of new writing and lack of classical work on London stages, this enterprising and determined company is doing us all a service. – The Stage

It's a bold, brave enterprise – The Guardian

Company 

After seeing the Schaubühne Berlin at Edinburgh International Festival in 2004, Mark Leipacher created The Faction Theatre Company in 2008.  The Faction became a registered charity in 2011.  Their first production was Richard III at the Brockley Jack Theatre, London, in October 2008. The Faction is now led by two artistic directors; Mark Leipacher and Rachel Valentine Smith, and is supported by a core ensemble of eleven actors and associate artists.

Ensemble
Alex Guiney
Amelia Donkor
Anna-Maria Nabirye
Christopher Hughes
Christopher York
Clare Latham
Gareth Fordred
Jude Owusu
Kate Sawyer
Lachlan McCall
Natasha Rickman

Associate artists
Gareth Jandrell – Playwright
Emily Juniper – Playwright
Suzie Foster – Stage Manager
Max Pappenheim – Sound Designer
Chris Withers – Lighting Designer

History 

During The Faction's formative years, they toured across the UK, played studio theatres across London, and established an open-air season in Brockwell Park. They were then invited to be an associate ensemble of the New Diorama Theatre. With the support of their 5-year relationship at The New Diorama, The Faction was able to trial a more permanent model of working in repertory theatre, with a core ensemble.  

Since 2012, The Faction have produced five annual sell-out repertory seasons, engaging with over 26,000 audience members and 4,000 students. In 2016, The Faction partnered with Selfridges to create an auditorium in their Oxford Street store for Shakespeare 400 celebrations, where they produced a version of Much Ado About Nothing to critical acclaim. The Faction took their work even further afield later that year, in partnership with the British Council, and the American University of Beirut, producing and co-directing an Arabic premiere production of King Lear.

In addition to Shakespeare, The Faction have produced work by other classic writers such Cervantes, Euripides, Gorky, Lorca and Schiller. They also bridge the divide between classics and new writing by engaging some of the UK's most exciting and emerging writers. To date, this has included Ranjit Bolt (Three Sisters), Gareth Jandrell (Thebes, published by Bloomsbury Methuen Drama), Emily Juniper (Miss Julie and Vassa Zheleznova) and two unique projects: Reptember and Demetrius.  

Reptember is an Off West End award-nominated project, consisting of 12 classic texts adapted for solo performance by some of our most promising playwrights, including Jessica Sian and Will Gore.

Demetrius is an ongoing portmanteau project to complete Schiller's final unfinished work. Established writers such as April de Angelis, Glyn Maxwell and Simon Reade complete a "unit" before passing the baton to up and coming writers like Jon Brittain and Daniel Kanaber.

Productions 
2008
Richard III – Shakespeare
2009
Macbeth – Shakespeare
Twelfth Night – Shakespeare
2010
The Tempest – Shakespeare
Intrigue/Love – Schiller in a version by Mark Leipacher & Daniel Millar 
Canterbury Tales – Chaucer
The Robbers – Schiller in a version by Mark Leipacher & Daniel Millar
2011
Strindberg's Apartment – Strindberg adapted by Simon Reade
The Odyssey – Homer
A Midsummer Night's Dream – Shakespeare
Arabian Nights – Folklore
2012
Twelfth Night – Shakespeare
Mary Stuart – Schiller in a version by Mark Leipacher & Daniel Millar
Miss Julie – Strindberg in a version by Emily Juniper
Othello – Shakespeare
2013
Fiesco – Schiller in a version by Mark Leipacher & Daniel Millar
Three Sisters – Chekhov in a version by Ranjit Bolt
Blood Wedding – Lorca in a version by Gareth Jandrell
2014
Hamlet – Shakespeare
Thebes – Aeschylus in a version by Gareth Jandrell
Shakespeare's Lovers – Shakespeare
Reptember: Solo – Various
2015
Romeo & Juliet – Shakespeare
The Talented Mr Ripley – Highsmith in a version by Mark Leipacher
Joan of Arc – Schiller in a version by Mark Leipacher
2016
Richard III – Shakespeare
Reptember Reloaded: Solo Season – Various
Vassa Zheleznova – Gorky in a version by Emily Juniper
Much Ado About Nothing – Shakespeare 
King Lear – Shakespeare (Arabic language premiere, Lebanon)

Awards 

The Faction have been awarded the Peter Brook Ensemble Award and won the OffWestEnd award for Best Ensemble.  In addition, they have been nominated for OffWestEnd awards in the following categories: Best Director / Best Actor (3 nominations) / Best Supporting Actress / Best Supporting Actor / Best Lighting Design and Most Promising New Playwright.  The Faction were also nominated for OffWestEnd's TBC Award – for the productions that defy traditional categories. In addition, The Faction were nominated for Best Artistic Director at the London Theatre Awards, and for the Individual Award at the National Stage Management Awards.

References

External links
 Official Homepage
 The Brockley Jack Theatre official Homepage
 The Tabard Theatre official Homepage
 Austin Hardiman at Mensdivision

Theatre companies in London
Touring theatre